In biodiversity studies, the checkerboard score or C-score is a statistic which determines the randomness of the distribution of two or more species through a collection of biomes.  The statistic, first published by Stone and Roberts in 1990, expands on the earlier work of Diamond that defined a notion of "checkerboard distributions" as an indicator of species competition.

A low c-score indicates a higher randomness, i.e. a greater likelihood that the distribution of one species has not been directly affected by the presence of other species.

Definition and calculation

Given two species sp1, sp2 and n islands, an incident matrix is built.
In the  incident matrix, each row represents one of the two species and each column represents a different island.
The matrix is then filled with each cell being set to either 0 or 1. Cell with the value of 0 means that a given species doesn't exist in the given island whilst the value of 1 means that the species do exist in the given island.

The calculation of the co-occurrence of two species sp1, sp2 in the given set of islands is done as follows:

  - C-score for the two species sp1, sp2 in the given set of islands
 - The number of co-occurrences of sp1, sp2
  -  Number of islands in which sp1 has 1
 -  Number of islands in which sp2 has 1

The checkerboard score (c-score) for the colonisation pattern is then calculated as the mean number of checkerboard units per species-pair in the community:

For M species, there are  species-pairs, so C-score is calculated:

The C-score is sensitive to the proportion of islands that are occupied, thereby confounding comparisons between matrices or sets of species pairs within them.  An extension of the C-score therefore standardizes by the number of islands each species-pair occupies using:

References

Ecology
Biodiversity